Elections were held in Kentucky on Tuesday, November 2, 2010. Primary elections were held on May 18, 2010.

Federal

United States Senate

The nominees are Kentucky Attorney General Jack Conway (Democratic Party) and Rand Paul (Republican Party).

United States House

All six Kentucky seats in the United States House of Representatives are up for election in 2010.

State
There were no statewide offices up for election in 2010.

State Senate

All of the seats of the Kentucky Senate are up for election in 2010.

State House of Representatives

All of the seats in the Kentucky House of Representatives are up for election in 2010.

Judicial positions
Multiple judicial positions will be up for election in 2010.
Kentucky judicial elections, 2010 at Judgepedia

Ballot measures
At least two statewide ballot questions had been proposed for the November 2, 2010 ballot, but neither was sent by the Legislature:
1. Allow slot machines at horse tracks.
2. Remove oath of office language swearing never to have participated in a duel.
Kentucky 2010 ballot measures at Ballotpedia

Local
Many elections for county offices will also be held on November 2, 2010.

References

External links
Kentucky State Board of Elections
Kentucky Candidate List at Imagine Election - Search for candidates by address or zip code
U.S. Congress Candidates for Kentucky at Project Vote Smart
Kentucky Polls at Pollster.com
Kentucky Congressional Races in 2010 campaign finance data for federal candidates from OpenSecrets
Kentucky 2010 campaign finance data for state-level candidates from Follow the Money